Oktyabrsky District is an administrative and municipal district (raion), one of the twenty-two in Primorsky Krai, Russia. It is located in the southwest of the krai. Its administrative center is the rural locality (a selo) of Pokrovka. Population:  The population of Pokrovka accounts for 34.5% of the district's total population.

Notable residents 

Alexandra Kim (1885–1918), Korean revolutionary political activist, born in the Korean village of Sinelnikovo
Valery Zorkin (born 1943), Chairman of the Constitutional Court of the Russian Federation, born in Konstantinovka

References

Notes

Sources

Districts of Primorsky Krai